Ye Ethiopia Lijoch TV (Amharic: የኢትዮጵያ ልጆች ቲቪ) is an Ethiopian children's channel headquartered in Addis Ababa, Ethiopia. Owned by Ethiopia Lijoch P.L.C., it was launched in April 2019. The channel broadcasts programming mainly in Amharic with some programming in English.

History
Founded in April 2019 by seven professionals hailing from journalism, the arts, information technology, mass communication, education and other social science fields, the first television station dedicated to children's programming was established with 30 million birr (1 million dollar) in investment. The station commenced operations on African Child Day, a celebration initiated by the then Organization of African Unity in 1991.

References

External links

Television channels in Ethiopia
Television channels and stations established in 2019
Children's television networks
Satellite television